Interment.net is a United States-based website containing a free online database of transcriptions from headstones, intended to be a research tool for use by genealogists and historians.  , the site was one of the top 15 free genealogy websites on the Internet. Its cemetery database to date includes more than 6 million cemetery records from around the world. 

The database is limited to information transcribed from grave markers at cemeteries and/or obtained from burial records from cemetery offices.  The data includes surname, given name, birth date, birthplace, death date, death place, age, inscription (including symbols), notes, and sometimes the location of the grave marker. The coverage of data addresses the problem for scholars and genealogists who cite the way cemetery records tend to be incomplete while some transcripts are inaccurate.

Many of the cemeteries transcribed on the site no longer exist, making the site one of the few sources for those inscriptions. Online cemetery databases with similar features include Findagrave.com and Billiongraves.com.

History
The site started in March 1997 as a personal web page called Cemetery Interment Lists on the Internet and was simply a list of links to websites with cemetery records.  In 1998, the site started accepting cemetery transcriptions directly; to stop the personal website from being overwhelmed, the page author registered the domain name "interment.net" in December 1998 and moved to a separate web hosting service.  By June 1999, the focus of the site had changed to hosting cemetery transcriptions, and the title was changed to Cemetery Records on the Internet, then later, Cemetery Records Online.

The site has had at least seven-page layouts since 1997.  It has been supported by advertising revenue since July 1999, and in 2005, the personal site owner incorporated Clear Digital Media, Inc. to control the site.  The company has since expanded, starting several other websites and weblogs. Interment.net is a volunteer website and is staffed by contributors and volunteers who go to cemeteries to take photographs for its digital repository and for transcription. Volunteers for these websites describe their labor as a "genealogical kindness," of particular service to those researching their ancestry.

See also 
 Canadian Headstones
 Find a Grave – an online database of cemetery records
 National Cemetery Administration's Nationwide Gravesite Locator
 Random Acts of Genealogical Kindness – volunteers photograph graves on request (inactive)
 Tombstone tourist

References

External links
Interment.net website

American genealogy websites
Internet properties established in 1997
Online person databases
Genealogy databases